The 2002 WNBA season was the third season for the Seattle Storm basketball team. They made to the playoffs for the first time, but losing to the Los Angeles Sparks in a sweep, who went on to win the WNBA Finals for the second year in a row. The Storm beat the Portland Fire by 1 game for the final spot, which the Fire would later cease operations.

Offseason

WNBA Draft
Sue Bird was among four of the top six draft picks, (along with Swin Cash (#2), Asjha Jones (#4) and Tamika (Williams) Raymond (#6) ) that were from the same team, the 2002 NCAA Champion University of Connecticut.

Regular season

Season standings

Season Schedule

Player stats

References

External links
Storm on Basketball Reference

Seattle Storm seasons
Seattle
2002 in sports in Washington (state)